Oniceni is a commune in Neamț County, Western Moldavia, Romania. It is composed of eleven villages: Ciornei, Gorun, Linseşti, Lunca, Mărmureni, Oniceni, Pietrosu, Poiana Humei, Pustieta, Solca and Valea Enei.

References

Communes in Neamț County
Localities in Western Moldavia